Saw V is a 2008 horror film directed by David Hackl, in his directorial debut, from a screenplay by Patrick Melton and Marcus Dunstan. It is the fifth installment in the Saw film series and a sequel to 2007's Saw IV. The film stars Tobin Bell, Costas Mandylor, Scott Patterson, Betsy Russell, Mark Rolston, Julie Benz, Carlo Rota, and Meagan Good.  

The plot follows FBI Agent Strahm investigating the murders committed by the Jigsaw Killer but as delves deeper into the case, he realizes that the murders are part of a larger, more intricate plot. Meanwhile, Jigsaw's accomplice, Mark Hoffman, has been promoted to lieutenant and is tasked with leading the investigation into the Jigsaw murders. However, as Strahm gets closer to the truth, he becomes the target of Jigsaw's traps.

Melton and Dunstan, the writers of Saw IV, returned to write the film.  Filming took place in Toronto from March to April 2008. Saw V was released by Lionsgate Films in the United States on October 24, 2008. The film received generally negative reviews from critics, but went on to gross $113.9 million worldwide. A sequel, titled Saw VI, was released in 2009.

Plot
Convicted murderer Seth Baxter wakes up chained to a table beneath a pendulum blade. He is told that he can release himself by crushing his hands between two presses. He does so, but the blade still bisects him as someone watches discreetly.

FBI agent Peter Strahm escapes from the room he was locked in by Detective Hoffman. He is then attacked by a figure in a pig mask and wakes up with his head sealed in a box being quickly filled with water. Outside, Hoffman delivers Corbett, the kidnapped daughter of Jeff, to the police and claims they are the only survivors. Strahm, having survived the trap by performing a tracheotomy with his pen, is brought out alive as well, much to Hoffman's shock.

Hoffman is promoted and credited with closing the Jigsaw case. Hoffman later finds a note in his office reading "I know who you are," and learns of Agent Lindsey Perez's death while taking Strahm's cell phone from the police evidence room. At the hospital, Strahm tells Hoffman that Perez's last words were "Detective Hoffman" and questions how he escaped the plant. After being put on medical leave by his boss, Agent Dan Erickson, Strahm, suspicious of Hoffman, decides to uncover his involvement with Jigsaw and takes case files of past Jigsaw victims to research them.

In an underground sewer, Ashley, Brit, Charles, Luba and Mallick awaken with collars locked around their necks, connected by cables to a set of blades mounted on the wall behind them. The keys to the collars are in individual glass boxes across the room. A videotape informs them that they are all connected and that they must "do the opposite" of their instincts if they are all to survive the tests ahead of them. Ashley fails to retrieve the key and gets decapitated. In the second room, which is filled with explosives on a timer, Charles first attacks Mallick and then Luba, but she, Brit and Mallick each to retrieve keys to bomb shelters set in the walls. Charles is left to die when the timer expires and the explosives detonate. In the third room, Brit kills Luba and she and Mallick connect her corpse to five cables to complete an electric circuit that unlocks the next door. In the final room, Mallick and Brit find a machine fitted with five saws and a beaker requiring ten pints of blood to open the final door. They realize that all prior tests could have been completed without casualties if they had worked together, and figure out their connection: they were all involved in a building fire that killed eight people. Mallick and Brit concede a truce and each slice an arm in the saws to provide the blood needed to open the final door.

Strahm learns that Hoffman killed Seth Baxter, who had killed Hoffman's sister, years prior. John Kramer abducted Hoffman after the fact and blackmailed him into helping him set up his future "games." Strahm concludes that everyone was meant to die at the plant except for Corbett and Hoffman. John's ex-wife Jill Tuck claims Strahm is stalking her. After Hoffman tells Erickson about Strahm's theory of a second Jigsaw accomplice, Erickson tries to call him. Hoffman answers on Strahm's phone and hangs up. Erickson has one of his agents track the phone's signal.

Following the signal to the sewer observation room, Erickson finds the phone and his own personnel file, both planted by Hoffman. He also finds the still-living Brit and Mallick and calls for medical attention, before putting an all-points bulletin on Strahm, convinced that he is Jigsaw's successor. Meanwhile, Strahm follows Hoffman to the renovated nerve gas house and finds a tape. In the tape, Hoffman urges Strahm to enter the box, but he stops it short and ambushes Hoffman, whom he seals in the box. Strahm believes he has finally caught Hoffman, but the door to the room suddenly shuts itself and the walls begin to close in as the box is lowered beneath the floor. Strahm finishes playing the tape, which warns him that if he does not enter the box, he will die and be framed as Jigsaw's apprentice. Safe inside the box, Hoffman watches as Strahm unsuccessfully tries to escape the room and is ultimately crushed to death.

Cast

Production

Development and writing
Pre-production began in October 2007 with Saw IV writers Patrick Melton and Marcus Dunstan outlining the story.  David Hackl made his directorial debut with Saw V. He previously served as the production designer of Saw II, Saw III, and Saw IV and second unit director for Saw III and Saw IV.   Hackl spoke about the fast-paced writing process saying, "We have about a week to write the outline, then the script by the end of the month. We're really just throwing down the ideas now and it's coming together quickly. I've been with Darren on all of [the sequels], we've always arrived just before Christmas with a script that needed a lot of shakedown but, before shooting, [the script] is really tight. Right until the last days of filming we're always changing things and adjusting things just seeing what works as the story unfolds and I think that's why people like them - because we never let them rest. We don't go into pre-production with a white script and say, 'That's it no changes.' We push it so there's no holes." He aimed to bring a more emotional context to film so the audience would have an emotional investment to the character in the traps. Without that, Hackl felt the traps would be "just like any gory horror film", which he did not want.

Casting and filming
Tobin Bell, Scott Patterson, Costas Mandylor and Betsy Russell reprised their roles as Jigsaw/John, Agent Strahm, Detective Hoffman, and Jill, respectively. Patterson had signed on through Saw VI but stated, "that doesn't mean I'll actually be in it or do it. It's their option".  Bell, whose character was killed in Saw III, shot all new flashback scenes for the film. Bell stated that Russell's character Jill, who plays his ex-wife, would not be featured as prominently as in Saw IV, but "still plays an important part in the story". 

Julie Benz was cast as Brit, a real estate developer who is put in a Jigsaw trap.  Bentz described her as a "very unlikeable character". On her experience filming she said, "Filming the movie freaked me out. I had nightmares. I'd never been in a psychological horror movie. It actually affected me on a deep level. I don't know if I can actually see this one". However, Benz praised Hackl's directing techniques, such as using a full storyboard on set which helped the actor's know the correct camera angles at any given time.

Principal photography took place from March 17 to April 28, 2008 in Toronto.

Reception

Box office
Saw V was released in the United States on October 24, 2008 by Lionsgate Films.  In its opening weekend, Saw V grossed $30,053,954 in 3,060 theaters in the United States and Canada, ranking number two at the box office behind High School Musical 3: Senior Year. It grossed $56,746,769 in the United States and Canada, and an additional $57,117,290 in other markets, for a worldwide total of $113,864,059.

Critical reception
The film received generally negative reviews from critics. The review aggregator Rotten Tomatoes reports an approval rating of 13% based on 76 reviews, with a weighted average of 2.92/10. The site's consensus states "If its plot were as interesting as its torture devices, or its violence less painful than its performances, perhaps Saw V might not feel like it was running on fumes." Metacritic reported the film had an average score of 20 out of 100, based on 13 reviews. Audiences polled by CinemaScore gave the film an average grade of "C" on an A+ to F scale.

Elizabeth Weizman of the New York Daily News gave Saw V one out of five stars. She believed that the lack of Tobin Bell's Jigsaw character hurt the film: "Bell's deliciously twisted madman was the lifeline of this series and, without him, we're left watching a routine horror flick that might as well have gone straight to DVD. The series began with two major assets that set it apart: the concept of a brilliantly righteous executioner, and the actor who played him. Now, aside from Bell's brief, intermittent cameos, it has neither. So where the original Saw was diabolical fun, this fifth installment is as bloodless as the most unfortunate of Jigsaw's victims." Sam Adams of the Los Angeles Times wrote that "The virtues of the individual films are almost beside the point, since it's hard to imagine why anyone would want to pick up the thread at this late date, but Saw V is a particularly dull and discombobulated affair, shot and acted with all the flair of a basic-cable procedural".

Some reviews were positive, however. The British website Digital Spy rated it three out of five stars and commended the film for its "solid acting, slick direction and suitably filthy cinematography too", while also stating it will "make far more sense to those familiar with the previous installments". Jim Vejvoda of IGN awarded the film with three out of five stars stating that the film ties up most of the loose ends of the previous four installments while also having a more straightforward and less complicated storyline. They also praised the traps for being the most inventive and best that the Saw franchise has had to offer.

Home Media
Charlie Clouser, who provided the score for all previous Saw films, returned to compose the score for the film.  The "Saw V Original Motion Picture Soundtrack" was released on October 21, 2008 by Artists' Addiction Records. Spence D. from IGN.com gave the soundtrack a score of 7.9 out of 10, saying, "From start to finish the Saw V soundtrack flows with a sense of purpose and cohesion, the tracks having a unifying dark undercurrent that makes for an electric shocked jolting mixtape with dark intent." 

Saw V was released on DVD on January 20, 2009.  An unrated director's cut was released and runs approximately 3 minutes longer than the theatrical cut.

References

External links

 
 
 
 
 

5
2008 films
Crime horror films
2008 horror films
2000s action horror films
American horror thriller films
American sequel films
American splatter films
Canadian splatter films
Canadian sequel films
2000s English-language films
Films scored by Charlie Clouser
Films directed by David Hackl
Films shot in Toronto
Lionsgate films
Torture in films
2008 directorial debut films
2000s American films
2000s Canadian films